Anuraga Sangama is a 1995 Indian Kannada-language romantic drama film directed and written by V. Umakanth. The film stars Ramesh Aravind, Kumar Govind and Sudharani.

The film is loosely inspired by the Charlie Chaplin film City Lights. The same film was remade in Telugu in 1997 as Pelli Pandiri,  in Tamil in 1999 as Nilave Mugam Kaattu and Hindi in 2006 as Humko Tumse Pyaar Hai.

Cast
 Kumar Govind
 Ramesh Aravind
 Sudharani
 B. Sarojadevi
 Tennis Krishna
 Bank Janardhan
 V. Manohar
 Ashalatha
 Lohitashwa
 Mico Seetharam

Soundtrack
All the songs are composed, scored and lyrics written by V. Manohar. The song "O Mallige Ninnondige" was an instant hit and won the singer Ramesh Chandra Karnataka State Film Award for Best Male Playback Singer.

References

External links 
 

1995 films
1990s Kannada-language films
1995 romantic drama films
Indian buddy films
1990s buddy films
Indian romantic drama films
Kannada films remade in other languages
Films scored by V. Manohar